Sanam (also Romanized as Şanam) is a village in Balatajan Rural District, in the Central District of Qaem Shahr County, Mazandaran Province, Iran. At the 2006 census, its population was 362, in 91 families.

References 

Populated places in Qaem Shahr County